Stan Barnes (born August 18, 1961) is an American politician who served in the Arizona House of Representatives from the 21st district from 1989 to 1993 and in the Arizona Senate from the 21st district from 1995 to 1997.

References

1961 births
Living people
Republican Party members of the Arizona House of Representatives
Republican Party Arizona state senators
20th-century American politicians
Politicians from Mesa, Arizona